Steccherinum is a widely distributed genus of toothed crust fungi in the family Steccherinaceae.

Taxonomy
Steccherinum was circumscribed by Samuel Frederick Gray in his 1821 work A Natural Arrangement of British Plants.

Description
Steccherinum fungi have a range of fruit body morphologies, including resupinate (crust-like), effused-reflexed (crust-like with the edges extending outwards to form caps), or pileate with either a stipe or only a stipe-like base.

Species
A 2008 estimate placed 33 species in Steccherinum. , Index Fungorum accepts 50 species:
S. agaricoides (Sw.) Banker (1906)
S. aggregatum Hjortstam & Spooner (1990) – Sabah
S. alaskense Lindsey & Gilb. (1980)
S. albidum Legon & P.Roberts (2002) – Great Britain
S. albofibrillosum (Hjortstam & Ryvarden) Hallenb. & Hjortstam (1988) – Costa Ric; Nepal; India
S. basibadium Banker (1912)
S. bourdotii Saliba & A.David (1988) – Europe; India
S. ciliolatum (Berk. & M.A.Curtis) Gilb. & Budington (1970) – Portugal; India
S. confragosum Maas Geest. & Lanq. (1975) – Brunei
S. crassiusculum K.A.Harrison (1964)
S. cremeoalbum Hjortstam (1984) – Sweden; Denmark; India
S. cremicolor H.S.Yuan & Sheng H.Wu (2012) – Taiwan
S. diversum Hjortstam & Melo (1999) – Roraima
S. elongatum H.S.Yuan & Sheng H.Wu (2012) – Taiwan
S. ethiopicum Maas Geest. (1974)
S. fimbriatum (Pers.) J.Erikss. (1958) – Europe; India

S. galeritum Maas Geest. (1974)
S. gilvum Maas Geest. (1974)
S. gracile (Pilát) Parmasto (1968)
S. helvolum (Zipp. ex Lév.) S.Ito (1955)
S. hydneum Rick ex Maas Geest. (1974)
S. labeosum Maas Geest. & Lanq. (1975) – Kenya
S. lacerum (P.Karst.) Kotir. & Saaren. (2009)
S. laeticolor (Berk. & M.A.Curtis) Banker (1912) – Latvia; South Carolina; India
S. lanestre Maas Geest. (1974)
S. lusitanicum (Bres.) Ryvarden (1981)
S. meridiochraceum Saliba & A.David (1988)
S. meridionale (Rajchenb.) Westphalen, Tomšovský & Rajchenb. (2018)
S. minutissimum Snell & E.A.Dick (1958)
Steccherinum neonitidum Westphalen & Tomšovský (2018)
S. ochraceum (Pers.) Gray (1821) – India
S. oreophilum Lindsey & Gilb. (1977) – United States; Europe; India
S. peckii Banker (1912)
S. perparvulum Hjortstam & Ryvarden (2008)
S. peruvianum Maas Geest. (1978)
S. plumarium (Berk. & M.A.Curtis) Banker (1906)
S. polycystidiferum (Rick) Westphalen, Tomšovský & Rajchenb. (2018)
S. pseudochraceum Saliba & A.David (1988)
S. rawakense (Pers.) Banker (1912) – China
S. reniforme (Berk. & M.A.Curtis) Banker (1906) – South America
S. resupinatum G.Cunn. (1958) – New Zealand
S. robustius (J.Erikss. & S.Lundell) J.Erikss. (1958) – Europe; India
S. russum Maas Geest. & Lanq. (1975) – Africa
S. scalare Maas Geest. & Lanq. (1975) – Africa
S. scruposum Maas Geest. & Lanq. (1975) – Africa
S. straminellum (Bres.) Melo (1995)
S. subcrinale (Peck) Ryvarden (1978) – India
S. subglobosum H.S.Yuan & Y.C.Dai (2005) – China
S. subulatum  H.S.Yuan & Y.C.Dai (2005) – China
S. tenue Burds. & Nakasone (1981)
S. tenuispinum Spirin, Zmitr. & Malysheva (2007)
S. undigerum (Berk & M.A.Curtis) Westphalen & Tomšovský (2018)
S. willisii Maas Geest. (1974)
S. zeylanicum Maas Geest. (1974)

References

Steccherinaceae
Polyporales genera
Fungi described in 1821
Taxa named by Samuel Frederick Gray